Duplicate is a 2009 Malayalam-language comedy drama film directed by Shibu Prabhakar and produced by Sajai Sebastian and Joji K. John under the banner of Zion International Film Factory with Suraj Venjaramoodu in the lead role. This is Suraj's first movie as a hero and he plays a double role in the movie. The film received mixed to negative reviews but highly positive reception from the public mainly due to the comedy and performance of the lead actors.

Premise 
Shivan Kutty is a jobless village lad, who finds it difficult to pay back his increasing debts. He is in love with his cousin Meenakshi, though his uncle Keshu doesn't quite approve her relation with a good for nothing guy. Added to his routine of mayhem is a couple of professional killers, who runs after him due to a misunderstanding. But life turns to colourful patches when Sivan Kutty gets mistaken as Jeevan, a look alike wealthy businessman, following a car accident. Sivan Kutty is taken into the wealthy house of Jeevan where he lives in luxury. Meanwhile, Jeevan is mistaken as Sivan Kutty and is taken into Sivan Kutty's house. The rest of the plot revolves around Sivan Kutty helping the police ACP to bring under law the killers who are after Jeevan. In the end Sivan Kutty reunites with his love Meenakshi.

Cast
 Suraj Venjaramoodu as Sivankutty and Jeevan Raj (dual role) 
 Roopashree as Meenakshi
 Innocent as Sivankutty's uncle
 Bheeman Raghu as Dasappan
 Salim Kumar as Professional killer 1
 Bijukuttan as Professional killer 2
 Riza Bava as Maheendran
 Rasmi Boban as Sivankutty's sister
 Maniyanpilla Raju as Sivankutty's brother in law
 Riyaz Khan as ACP Antony Rosarrio
 Lalu Alex as Keshavan Pattaalam
 Ambika Mohan as Sivankutty's mother
 Anoop Chandran as Jeevan Raj's P.A
 Mythili Roy 
 Dr Rony David as Jeevan Raj's brother
 Kalabhavan Shajohn 
 Machan Varghese 
 Bindu Murali

External links 
 Watch on Gigaplex
 Duplicate at IndiaGlitz.com
 Duplicate at OneIndia.in
 Nowrunning review
 Indiaglitz review

2009 films
2000s Malayalam-language films
Films shot in Palakkad